John Towers (21 December 1913 – 3 January 1979) was an English footballer who scored 22 goals from 107 appearances in the Football League playing as an inside right or wing half for Darlington either side of the Second World War. A schoolteacher by profession, he played as an amateur.

References

1913 births
1979 deaths
People from Willington, County Durham
Footballers from County Durham
English footballers
Association football inside forwards
Association football wing halves
Darlington F.C. players
Willington A.F.C. players
English Football League players